Hell in the Heavens is a 1934 American aviation drama film directed by John G. Blystone and written by Byron Morgan, Ted Parsons and Jack Yellen based on the stage play Der Flieger by Hermann Rossmann. The film stars Warner Baxter, Conchita Montenegro, Russell Hardie, Herbert Mundin, Andy Devine and William Stelling. The film was released on November 9, 1934, by Fox Film Corporation.

Plot
During World War I, American ace pilot Lieutenant Steve Warner (Warner Baxter) leads a group of replacements for the French Lafayette Escadrille. Captain Andre DeLaage (William Stack) is in charge but he has lost many pilots shot down by the German ace known only as "The Baron" (Arno Frey).

Steve falls in love with Aimee (Conchita Montenegro), a French girl. After a German air raid, the flyers keep the only bottle of bourbon calling it the "bottle of death" to be used only to toast the downing of German pilots. During a morning patrol, DeLaage is shot down by The Baron, who returns his helmet by parachute. Warner, now in command, vows to bring The Baron down. He shoots down Schroeder (Rudolph Anders), a German officer who tells him that The Baron already shot down 32 flyers. New man, Corporal Teddy May (William Stelling), has repeatedly turned back because of disturbing dreams where he is shot down in flames by The Baron. Steve also has the same dreams of being shot down.

Steve proposes to Aimee but she is afraid for him. In a series of aerial battles, Steve shoots down the Baron's younger brother while the Baron shoots down May, and issues a challenge to Steve. Despite Aimee's pleas, Steve flies alone and during their dogfight, his guns jam, but he drives his aircraft into the Baron, bringing both of them down. Steve drags the Baron to safety and proposes they drink a toast from the "bottle of death," Stephen is surprised to hear the Baron also has dreams of dying.

Cast

Warner Baxter as Lt. Steve Warner
Conchita Montenegro as Aimee
Russell Hardie as 2nd Lt. Hartley
Herbert Mundin as Granny Biggs
Andy Devine as Sgt. "Ham" Davis
William Stelling as Cpl. Teddy May
Ralph Morgan as Lt. "Pop" Roget
Vince Barnett as Ace McGurk
William Stack as Capt. Andre De Laage
J. Carrol Naish as Sgt. Chevalier
Johnny Arthur as Clarence Perkins
Arno Frey as Baron Kurt von Hagen
Rudolph Anders as Lt. Schroeder
Vincent Carato as Sgt. Cortez

Production
Hell in the Heavens was based on the stage play, Flieger by Hermann Rossman (copyrighted 1931) and the English-language adaptation, The Ace, by Miles Malleson (London, Aug 1933). In adapting the play, the production company (Fox) agreed in writing when they purchased the rights to the play not to make any changes "which shall in tone or form discredit the honour of Germany." Screenwriter Byron Morgan further stated the play was based on the experiences of officers and men in a German flying squadron and those of his co-writer, Ted Parsons, who had been a member of the Lafayette Escadrille. The introduction of a new comic character with Andy Devine as Sgt. "Ham" Davis was the only major departure from the tone of the original play.

In order to create the screenplay, a great number of screenwriters were involved, including 'Frank "Spig" Wead, a noted aviation writer who had been involved in many productions during the 1930s.

Most of the location photography was done at Baker's Ranch in Saugus, California. One of the major locales for the film was a castle that was found at the Fussell Brothers Ranch in Triunfo, California.

Some stock footage from Hell's Angels (1930) were obtained. The other aircraft that were assembled for the film included Nieuport 28 and Garland-Lincoln LF-1 fighter aircraft.

Reception
Although lukewarm in his personal assessment, The New York Times film reviewer Frank S. Nugent, stated: "Endowed with the talents of Warner Baxter, some excellent aerial photography and the exciting title, "Hell in the Heavens," the film went on view last night at the Mayfair Theatre and seemed to please its audience. Which is to say that the spectators appeared to be no little impressed by the traditional delineation of the heroism, hysteria and humor that are common to most cinematic flying squadrons."

See also
 List of American films of 1934

References

Notes

Citations

Bibliography

 Beck, Simon D. The Aircraft-Spotter's Film and Television Companion. Jefferson, North Carolina: McFarland and Company, 2016. .

External links
 
 

1934 films
American aviation films
Fox Film films
American drama films
1934 drama films
Films directed by John G. Blystone
American black-and-white films
1930s English-language films
1930s American films